Jennifer Driwaru (born in 1982) is a Ugandan politician and businesswoman, a women's representative for Maracha District in the 11th Ugandan Parliament affiliated to National Resistance Movement (NRM).

Background and education 
Driwaru was born and grew up in Yivu sub-county, Loinya Parish in Aliro East Village to Orijaba John, a retired police commander who served as a district police commander (DPC) and Florence Drijaru, a businesswoman.

In 1995, Driwaru completed her Primary Leaving Examinations (PLE) from Maracha Primary School, her O level in 1999 and A level (she did LEG/Fine art) in 2001 from Maracha Secondary School. In 2004, She did a diploma in education with arts and later joined Kyambogo University where she attained her bachelor's degree in Guidance And Counselling in 2012, a postgraduate diploma in Social Work and Social Administration in 2014 to 2015.

Career 
She worked as a teacher, teaching English language in Maracha Secondary School then she worked at St. Joseph's Hospital Maracha/ Ovujo Hospital as a social worker between 2022 and 2013. In 2007, Jennifer also worked with Baylor Uganda at Entebbe as a Counsellor with PHAs specialty. She also worked with National Identification Registration Authority (NIRA) as an enrollment officer in 2014 then as a social worker with International Rescue Committee(IRC) between 2017 and 2019.

Notable works 
Driwaru bought two ambulances for Maracha district from the money that was said to been given to her to buy a car.

See also 
List of members of the eleventh Parliament of Uganda

References 

Living people
National Resistance Movement politicians
Women members of the Parliament of Uganda
Kyambogo University alumni
1982 births
Members of the Parliament of Uganda
21st-century Ugandan politicians
21st-century Ugandan women politicians